Jack Harris (born 20 April 1986) is a Welsh-born folk singer-songwriter, musician, and poet. He is multi-award-winning, most notably winning the 2005 New Folk Songwriting Competition at Kerrville Folk Festival in Texas, the first non-American to do so. Jack Harris has been described as "a priest of song" by singer Anaïs Mitchell.

He has released three albums. His second album, The Flame and the Pelican, featured at number six in the July 2011 EuroAmericanaChart.

He has made several appearances at the Green Man Festival, and opened for such folk musicians as Martin Simpson, Tracy Grammer, Dick Gaughan, Martin Carthy, and Dave Swarbrick. He currently lives in London, and performs frequently in London folk clubs, as well as further afield.

References

External links
 jackharrismusic.com, his official website

Date of birth missing (living people)
1986 births
21st-century composers

21st-century Welsh poets
Living people
People from Builth Wells
Welsh folk singers
Welsh guitarists
21st-century Welsh male singers
Welsh male poets
Welsh singer-songwriters
21st-century British guitarists
British male singer-songwriters